Nik Lorbek  (born 17 April 1996) is a Slovenian footballer who plays as a midfielder.

Career
Lorbek played for NK Maribor for much of his youth. At the age of eighteen he moved on to the B-squad of Maribor. After having played for Maribor B for three seasons in the Slovenian third division, Lorbek moved to NŠ Mura in 2017. In his first season with Mura they were promoted to the Slovenian top division, and in his second they qualified for the UEFA Europa League. In the summer of 2019, he moved to Belgium and joined Royale Union Saint-Gilloise. In July 2021, Lorbek returned to Mura.

Honours
Mura
Slovenian Second League: 2017–18

Union SG
Belgian First Division B: 2020–21

References

External links
Nik Lorbek at NZS 

1996 births
Living people
Slovenian footballers
Slovenian expatriate footballers
Association football midfielders
NK Maribor players
NŠ Mura players
Royale Union Saint-Gilloise players
Slovenian Second League players
Slovenian PrvaLiga players
Challenger Pro League players
Slovenia youth international footballers
Slovenian expatriate sportspeople in Belgium
Expatriate footballers in Belgium